Daniels Ontužāns (born 7 March 2000) is a Latvian professional footballer who plays as a midfielder for SC Freiburg II and the Latvia national team.

Club career
Ontužāns began his youth career with JFC Skonto in Latvia, before joining the youth team of FC Augsburg after having moved to Germany. In 2010, he joined the youth academy of fellow Bavarian club Bayern Munich. Having moved into Bayern's under-19 team, in May 2018 he signed a new three-year contract lasting until 30 June 2021. Ontužāns made one appearance on the bench for Bayern's reserve team during the 2018–19 season. In June 2019, he was promoted to the Bayern's reserve team for the 2019–20 season in the 3. Liga. Ontužāns made his first appearance for the reserve team on 21 February 2021, during the 2020–21 season.

International career
Ontužāns previously trained with the under-15 and under-16 German youth selections.

On 27 May 2019, Ontužāns received his first call-up to the Latvia national team for the UEFA Euro 2020 qualifying matches against Israel and Slovenia. He made his international debut on 10 June 2019, coming on as a substitute in the 78th minute for Deniss Rakels in the match against Slovenia, which finished as a 5–0 home loss.

Personal life
Ontužāns was born in Vangaži, Latvia, but he moved to Augsburg with his parents, who relocated to Germany for work, when he was eight.

Career statistics

Club

International

References

External links
 
 
 
 
 

2000 births
Living people
People from Vangaži
Latvian footballers
Latvia international footballers
Association football midfielders
FC Bayern Munich II players
FC Bayern Munich footballers
SC Freiburg II players
3. Liga players
Latvian expatriate footballers
Latvian expatriate sportspeople in Germany
Expatriate footballers in Germany